This list of tallest buildings in Salt Lake City ranks skyscrapers in the U.S. city of Salt Lake City, Utah by height. The tallest building in the city is the Wells Fargo Center, which rises  and was completed in 1998. Minimum height for this list is 50 meters (164 feet). Buildings included in this list are confined to those still standing.

Completed buildings

Completed buildings ranked in each height range. 

Completed Buildings by Decade that are still standing and are a minimum of 50 meters (164 feet) tall.

List of the completed buildings in Salt Lake City that are a minimum of 50 meters (164 feet) tall.

Under construction and proposed

Under Construction

As of March 2023, two buildings are under construction with a height of at least .

Proposed
As of March 2023, there are currently nine proposed high-rises that are planned to rise at least .

Timeline of tallest buildings

References

Salt Lake City
Tallest in Salt Lake City